is a tram station operated by Tokyo Metropolitan Bureau of Transportation's  Tokyo Sakura Tram located in Arakawa, Tokyo Japan. It is 1.4 kilometres from the terminus of the Tokyo Sakura Tram at Minowabashi Station.

Layout
Arakawa-nanachome Station has two opposed side platforms.

Surrounding area
 Arakawa Sizen Park  . Machiya Bunka Centre

History
 April 1, 1913: Station opened

Railway stations in Tokyo
Railway stations in Japan opened in 1913
Arakawa, Tokyo